In mathematics, contraction principle may refer to:

 Contraction principle (large deviations theory), a theorem that states how a large deviation principle on one space "pushes forward" to another space
 Banach contraction principle, a tool in the theory of metric spaces